La Voiture À Eau is a Studio album by the French progressive rock band Ange. It was released in 1999.

Track listing
 "Le Rêve Est À Rêver [2ème Service]"  – 05:55
 "Psychosomagique Génie"  – 06:20
 "Eureka"  – 02:24
 "Bilboquet"  – 04:02
 "Elle Fait Mes Rides"  – 03:33
 "Eurékâ In Extenso"  – 02:30
 "L'eau Qui Dort"  – 05:02
 "Archimède"  – 03:55
 "Coma Des Mortels"  – 05:01
 "Quelquefois"  – 04:30
 "Ethnies"  – 05:12
 "Patisonges Et Mentisseries"  – 01:46
 "Mémoires De Jacob Delafon"  – 05:14
 "Et Gandhi L'indou Dit Tout Doux"  – 03:44
 "La Serrure Ou La Clé"  – 04:17
 "Jardin Secret"  – 04:55
 "La Voiture À Eau"  – 03:55

Personnel
 Lead Vocals, Acoustic Guitar, Keyboards: Christian Decamps
 Keyboards, Backing Vocals: Tristan Decamps
 Guitar, Backing Vocals: Hassan Hajdi
 Bass, Backing Vocals: Thierry Sidhoum
 Drums, Percussion: Hervé Rouyer

References
 La Voiture À Eau on ange-updlm 
 La Voiture À Eau on www.discogs.com

Ange albums
1999 albums